Torrance Ramon Small (born September 4, 1970) is a former professional American football wide receiver in the National Football League (NFL) for ten seasons for the New Orleans Saints, the St. Louis Rams, the Indianapolis Colts, the Philadelphia Eagles, and the New England Patriots.

References

1970 births
Living people
Thomas Jefferson High School (Tampa, Florida) alumni
Players of American football from Tampa, Florida
American football wide receivers
Alcorn State Braves football players
New Orleans Saints players
St. Louis Rams players
Indianapolis Colts players
Philadelphia Eagles players
New England Patriots players